Steve Bastien may refer to:

Steve Bastien (cricketer) (born 1963), English cricketer
Steve Bastien (decathlete) (born 1994), American decathlete